Marita Cheng  (born 5 March 1989) is the founder of Robogals. She was named the 2012 Young Australian of the Year. She is the founder and current CEO of Aubot, a start-up robotics company. She co-founded Aipoly, an app to assist blind people to recognise objects using their mobile phones. She was named as one of the World's Top 50 women in Technology by Forbes in 2018 and was recognized on the Forbes 30 Under 30 list in 2016. On 9 June 2019, Cheng was appointed a member of the  Order of Australia for significant service to science and technology, particularly to robotics.

Early life
Cheng was raised by her mother, a single parent who worked as a hotel room cleaner, in a housing commission apartment in Queensland, Australia.

Career
In 2007 while at university, Cheng founded Nudge, a company which provided reminders by phone or text message to help people manage their prescription drug schedules. She won a prize for the best undergraduate business at the University of Melbourne and then recruited friends to start designing workshops to teach girls about robotics. This became Robogals, which was founded in 2008 for the purpose of encouraging young women into careers in STEM fields. Cheng later graduated with a Bachelor of Engineering in mechatronics and a Bachelor of Computer Science.

In 2011 Cheng was awarded a Churchill Fellowship, which allowed her to visit the U.S., U.K., Germany and Jamaica to learn about international approaches to science education for young women.
In 2011, Cheng was also awarded the Anita Borg Institute's Change Agent ABIE Award.

In November 2011, Cheng was named Victorian Young Australian of the Year for 2012, and went on to be named as Young Australian of the Year. In that same year she was also a winner in the Financial Review – Westpac 100 Women of Influence awards' Young Leader category.

Cheng visited China as part of the 40 Year Anniversary of Australia-China Diplomatic Relations, touring Guangzhou, Shanghai, Nanjing, Tianjin and Beijing in 2012.

In 2013 she established a start-up robotics company.

Cheng delivered the closing keynote speech at the 35th World Congress of the World Association of Girl Guides and Girl Scouts in Hong Kong in 2014.

In 2015, Cheng attended Singularity University's flagship 10-week Graduate Studies Program, where she founded an app that uses AI to enable visually impaired people to recognize objects, receiving TechCrunch coverage during her time at the program. The app won a CES Best of Innovation Award in 2017.

Cheng co-led an Australian delegation of 50 entrepreneurs, industry representatives and government envoys, to Israel alongside Assistant Innovation Minister Wyatt Roy in 2015.

She co-founded Aipoly, which launched in January 2016. Aipoly is an app to assist blind people to recognise objects using their mobile phones.

Cheng returned to her robotics company, receiving a Myer Fellowship, and participated in the Advance Queensland Hot Desq program in 2017, relocating to Brisbane, Australia for 6 months, and the Austrade San Francisco Landing Pad in 2018, which brought her to San Francisco.

From 2012–2018, Cheng served on the board of the Foundation for Young Australians. Cheng helped decide on startup investments alongside Eddie McGuire as a board member of RMIT University's New Enterprise Investment Fund (2014-2017), and supported the Victorian startup ecosystem as a board member of the Victorian State Innovation Expert Panel (2016-2018). She was also involved with the Clinton Health Access Initiative as Technology Advisory Board Member (2016-2017).

Public appearance 
Cheng has given two TEDx talks, and has been a featured speaker at MIT Technology Review Conference in Singapore, IEEE International Conference on Robotics and Automation (ICRA), the World Entrepreneurship Forum in Lyon, the Global Summit of Women in Tokyo, and the Girl Scout National Convention in Utah.

She appeared live on TV as a panelist on ABC's Q&A, alongside Nobel laureates Brian Schmidt and Peter Doherty, Suzanne Cory and Chief Scientist of Australia Ian Chubb, and in 2011, served as a judge on The New Inventors. She spoke alongside Ashton Kutcher at Lenovo's #TECHmyway.

Cheng has been profiled in Vogue Australia, InStyle magazine, and The Australian Women's Weekly for her work as a technology entrepreneur.

Cheng frequently attends events via her company's Teleport robot, using the device to meet Prince Harry and Meghan, Duchess of Sussex in 2018, to appear on a panel with Israel's Chief Scientist Avi Hasson, and to give a speech at Robogals' 10-year anniversary gala dinner.

Awards and other accolades 
2012 – Young Australian of the Year
2014 – RoboHub 25 Women in Robotics you need to know about
2014 – Global Engineering Deans Council Diversity Award
2016 – Forbes 30 Under 30
2016 – Asia Society Asia Game Changer Award
2017 – American Australian Association Next Generation Leader
2018 – Forbes World's Top 50 Women in Tech
2018 - The NSW Award for Excellence in Women's Leadership

References

External links 
 Official website

1989 births
Living people
People from Cairns
Australian roboticists
Women roboticists
Australian people of Chinese descent
Members of the Order of Australia
University of Melbourne alumni
Australian people of Asian descent
Asia Game Changer Award winners